Ronald Wilfred (or Wilfrid) Gurney (1898, in Cheltenham, England – 14 April 1953, in New York, New York) was a British theoretical physicist and research pupil of William Lawrence Bragg at the Victoria University of Manchester during the 1920s and 1930s, Bristol University during the 1930s and later in the US, where he died.

Radioactive decay processes
Whilst at the Palmer Physical Laboratory at Princeton University from 1926 to 1928, he discovered alpha decay via quantum tunnelling, together with Edward Condon and independently of George Gamow. In the early 1900s, radioactive materials were known to have characteristic exponential decay rates or half lives. At the same time, radiation emissions were known to have certain characteristic energies. By 1928, Gamow had solved the theory of the alpha decay of a nucleus via quantum tunnelling and the problem was also solved independently by Gurney and Condon.

Books
Elementary quantum mechanics, Cambridge [Eng.] The University Press, 1934.
Introduction to statistical mechanics, New York, McGraw-Hill Book Co., 1949.
Electronic Processes in Ionic Crystals (1940, physics; with N.F. Mott)

See also
 Mott–Gurney law
 Gurney equations

References

1898 births
1953 deaths
Academics of the University of Bristol
Alumni of the Victoria University of Manchester
British nuclear physicists
British physicists